Bulgaria's first commercial nuclear reactor began operation in 1974.  The Kozloduy NPP operates two pressurized water reactors with a total output of 1906 MW. This makes Bulgaria the 21st-largest user of nuclear power in the world. Construction of the Belene Nuclear Power Plant was officially terminated in March 2012, and a thermal powerplant was supposed to be built on the site. Efforts in May 2018 to restart the Belene project were unsuccessful. , Bulgaria plans to construct new reactors at the existing Kozloduy site.

Radioactive waste 
Bulgaria has a state agency in charge of radioactive waste disposal. Under a 2002 agreement, Bulgaria pays Russia $620 thousand/ton to reprocess spent fuel. The country also spent  to construct a new storage facility and had plans to build another facility by 2015 but it didn't happen as predicted.

Reactors

See also 

 Energy in Bulgaria
 Politics of Bulgaria

References

External links 
 Uranium Information Center: Nuclear energy in Bulgaria
 Bulgarian Subject Files - Ecology: Nuclear Power Plant at Blinken Open Society Archives, Budapest
 World Nuclear Association Report on Bulgaria's Nuclear Energy History and Present